The Reich Ministry of Science, Education and Culture (also unofficially known as the "Reich Education Ministry", or "REM") existed from 1934 until 1945 under the leadership of Bernhard Rust and was responsible for unifying the education system of Nazi Germany and aligning it with the goals of Nazi leadership.

Background

The REM was the successor to the former Preußisches Ministerium für Wissenschaft, Kunst und Volksbildung (Prussian Ministry of Science, Art and Culture), creating for the first time in Germany a centralized and hierarchical institution in control of the Reich's education sector.  In 1934, the REM took over from the Reichsinnenministerium (Reich Interior Ministry) the supervision of colleges and universities in Germany, as well as research institutions such as the Physikalisch-Technische Reichsanstalt (abbreviated PTR; translation: Reich Physical and Technical Institute.); today, the PTR is known as the Physikalisch-Technische Bundesanstalt.

Administrators

Heads of the REM Amt für Wissenschaft (Science Office)

Bibliography
Hentschel, Klaus, editor and Ann M. Hentschel, editorial assistant and Translator Physics and National Socialism: An Anthology of Primary Sources (Birkhäuser, 1996)

Notes

Political history of Germany
Education in Nazi Germany
Science and technology in Nazi Germany
Science, Education and Culture
Ministries established in 1934
Ministries disestablished in 1945
1934 establishments in Germany
1945 disestablishments in Germany